Björn Frantzén (born 26 January 1977) is a chef and former footballer. Frantzén runs Frantzén (Stockholm) and Zén (Singapore), restaurants that holds three stars in the Michelin Guide each, and owns several other restaurants in Stockholm and Asia.

Career
Frantzén was born in Solna, Stockholm, Sweden. He played football for AIK between 1992 and 1996 before starting his career as a chef. At first, Frantzén worked as a chef at Edsbacka krog before going on to work at other restaurants, such as Chez Nico's, Dining Lettonie, Pied a Terre, and L'Arpege.

Frantzén opened Frantzén/Lindeberg in 2008. The restaurant was awarded its first Michelin star in 2009, and its second in 2010. Frantzén/Lindeberg continued to be rated two stars through 2016. Frantzén/Lindeberg was named number 12 of the 50 Best Restaurants Of The Year in The White Guide.

In addition, Frantzén started Catering Frantzén and Gaston. Gaston was one of a few wine bars in Stockholm. Frantzén was also the creator of the project "Exceptional Swedish Quality Food" that strives to lift Swedish raw products to a world-class standard. The project was done in partnership with Visit Sweden, LRF (Lantbrukarnas Riksförbund), Martin and Servera, Swedish Meat, and the Swedish Board of Agriculture.

In 2016 his first international restaurant was opened — Frantzén’s Kitchen in Hong Kong. Summer 2018 he opened the Flying Elk in Hong Kong that was closed by the end of 2019 due to the economic recession. Late 2018, he opened Zén in Singapore which follows his novel "3-floors of eating experience" to be had at Frantzén. In 2021 Zén received its third Michelin star. 

Stockholm's The Flying Elk, Corner Club and Gaston were sold in summer 2019. 

Brasserie Astoria was opened in spring 2021.

Personal life
Frantzén was married to his long time partner Sara Sandberg in July 2016. Together they have two daughters, Leiah and Stella, who live with them in Stockholm.

Media
In August 2012, Frantzén ran Sweden's Twitter account for a week. During his run he gave out cooking advice and deflected jokes comparing him to the Swedish Chef.

In 2014 Frantzén starred in cooking reality-show "Frantzén styr upp" produced by TV3.

In the summer of 2014 he did a series of commercials for Mariestads, the export beer from Spendrups brewery.

In 2015 Sveriges Television released documentary Hunger on Björn Frantzén and Daniel Lindeberg that was shot in 2012.

Bibliography

Awards 
Frantzén's restaurants have been given the following awards: 
 OAD:  #1 Restaurant in Europe
 3 Michelin stars: 2018
 2 Michelin stars: 2010, 2011, 2012, 2013
 12th best restaurant in 2013: Restaurant magazine
 Sweden's best restaurant: 2011, 2012, The White Guide
 Sweden's best food in 2010, the White Guide
 Chefs Pub 2013: Restaurant World
 Chef of Chefs 2013: Restaurant World
 Gulddraken Luxury 2013: DN
 AA Gill's Guest Drake in 2013: DN

References

External links 
 Frantzén Official Page
 Exceptional Swedish Quality Food official page 

1977 births
Footballers from Stockholm
Swedish chefs
Swedish footballers
Living people
Association footballers not categorized by position